Kyivskyi District is an urban district of the city of Kharkiv, Ukraine, named after the capital city of Ukraine, Kyiv. It is the biggest raion of the city and one of the oldest.

The district was created in 1937 when Petynsko-Zhuravlivskyi District was split into Kahanovychskyi and Stalinskyi districts. In 1957 Kahanovchskyi District was renamed Kyivskyi District.

Places
 District's center
 Saltivka micro-district 522
 Pivnichna Saltivka (micro-districts): 2, 3, 4, 5
 Piatykhatky
 settlement Zhukovskoho (after Nikolay Yegorovich Zhukovsky)
 Verkhnya Shyshkivka, Nyzhnya Shyshkivka
 Velyka Danylivka
 Zhuravlivka
 Shevchenky
 Komunar
 Tyurinka

External links
 Kyiv Raion website

Urban districts of Kharkiv